Bowiea is a genus of bulbous, perennial, succulent plants which thrive in dry and desert regions of eastern and southern Africa. It is native to a region stretching from Kenya to Cape Province.  The genus contains a single species, Bowiea volubilis.

The genus is named after the nineteenth-century British plant collector at Kew, James Bowie.

Description 

The plants have many overlapping scales, which form a tight, pale green, spherical bulb that grows to 8 in (20 cm) above the soil, sending up a twining fresh-green branched stem with few linear deciduous leaves. Dormant in winter, when the outer scales and many of the scale tips dry to a paper-like state, the plants burst to growth in late spring or summer, producing one or more very fast-growing stems that needs to be supported by a trellis or stake. The stems are covered with many leafless side-branches that may fall off. The small greenish-white flowers appear in spring.

Species
One species is recognized, with two subspecies

Bowiea volubilis (climbing-onion, sea onion)
Bowiea volubilis subsp. gariepensis (van Jaarsv.) Bruyns – Namibia, Cape Province
Bowiea volubilis subsp. volubilis – from Cape Province to Kenya

Cultivation

The plants prefer gritty well-drained soil in partial sun to shade. Water regularly during the growing season, and rarely if at all during dormancy. Propagate from seed, divisions, or from individual scales which once removed, will eventually form numerous bulbils.

References

External links
 
Graf, Alfred Byrd (1986) Tropica: color cyclopedia of exotic plants and trees for warm-region horticulture–in cool climate the summer garden or sheltered indoors; 3rd ed. East Rutherford, N.J.: Roehrs Co
Lord, Tony (2003) Flora : The Gardener's Bible : More than 20,000 garden plants from around the world. London: Cassell.  
Botanica Sistematica

Scilloideae
Monotypic Asparagaceae genera
Flora of Africa
Taxa named by Joseph Dalton Hooker